The Hinterreintalschrofen is a 2,669 m high peak on the main, east-west oriented crest (the Teufelsgrat or "Devil's Ridge") of the Wetterstein Mountains in the Eastern Alps. It is a massive and dominant mountain with a high rock face that plunges into the Reintal valley to the north and stamps the appearance of the Wetterstein when seen from the north. In spite of that, the mountain is rarely climbed. Its neighbouring peaks are the Hochwanner (2,746 m) to the west and the Hundstallköpfe (2,533 m) to the east. The Teufelsgrat runs along the national border between the Austrian state of Tyrol, (Gaistal) in the south and the  German state of Bavaria, (Reintal) in the north.

First ascent 
The mountain was first climbed either on 1 September 1871 by Freiherr Hermann von Barth or, according to  Stefan Beulke, not until 1897 by A. Heinrich and F. Henning.

Bases in the Gaistal valley 
Gaistalalm at 1356 m
Rotmoosalm at 1810 m
Hemermoosalm at 1417 m

Easiest ascent 
From the Rotmoosalm the normal route takes from 2 to 3 hours and runs up the southern flank of the Hinterreintalschrofen through rock gullies and scree slopes with rock outcrops to a crossing on the narrow western arête (Westgrat), which runs, exposed in places, to the very exposed summit. This route requires an ability to cope with grade I (UIAA) climbs.

References

Sources 
Stefan Beulke, Alpenvereinsführer Wetterstein, Munich, 1996, 
Alpenvereinskarte 1:25,000, Sheets 4/2 und 4/3, Wetterstein und Mieminger Gebirge

Mountains of the Alps
Mountains of Bavaria
Mountains of Tyrol (state)
Two-thousanders of Austria
Two-thousanders of Germany